Senator Horne may refer to:

Jim Horne (Florida politician), Florida State Senate
Mallory Horne (1925–2009), Florida State Senate
Thomas Van Horne (1782–1841), Ohio State Senate

See also
Senator Horn (disambiguation)
Senator Horner (disambiguation)